"I Wish You Could Have Turned My Head (And Left My Heart Alone)" is a song written by Sonny Throckmorton. He was also the first artist to release it, doing so on Last Cheater's Waltz in 1978. His version went to number 54 on the country music chart that year.

Conway Twitty recorded the song for his 1979 album Cross Winds.

The Oak Ridge Boys released the song in July 1982 as the second single from their album Bobbie Sue. This version went to number two on the same chart.

The posthumous 2013 B.W. Stevenson 2013 album Southern Nights includes a cover of this song.

Chart performance

References

1978 songs
1982 singles
Sonny Throckmorton songs
Conway Twitty songs
The Oak Ridge Boys songs
B. W. Stevenson songs
Songs written by Sonny Throckmorton
Song recordings produced by Ron Chancey
MCA Records singles
Mercury Records singles